EHC Winterthur is a Swiss professional ice hockey team who play in Winterthur in the canton of Zurich. They have played in the Swiss League (SL) since the 2015–16 season, the second tier of the main professional ice hockey leagues in Switzerland, behind the National League.

History
EHC Winterthur was founded in 1929 and remained as an amateur club in the Swiss Regio Leagues until earning promotion to the National League B for the first time in 1961, where Winterthur remained for two seasons before leaving. After relegation from the NLB, the club was merged with the second Winterthur club, EHC Veltheim, to form Rot-Wiess Winterthur on May 30, 1963. As a result, 1963 is also referenced as the club's foundation year.

Rot-Wiess played the following 6 years in the lower leagues before playing a lone season in the NLB in 1969. On April 22, 1980 the club returned to its original name as EHC Winterthur. In the 2009–10 season, EHC Winterthur won the Swiss amateur champion title, but due to lack of financial backing opted not to participate in the NLB.

EHC continued to play between the Regio leagues again earning claiming the Swiss amateur championship at the end of the 2014–15 season, defeating the like of  EHC Wiki-Münsingen and HC Sion-Nendaz.

Applying for promotion to the NLB, Winterthur gained its green card with increased financial power and solidified its position within the league through the 2015–16 season.

Honors
Swiss Regio League: (2) 2010, 2015

References

External links
 EHC Winterthur official website

Ice hockey teams in Switzerland
Ice hockey clubs established in 1929
Winterthur